The 2010 Peace Queen Cup was the third edition of the Peace Queen Cup. It was held from 17 to 23 October 2010 in Suwon, South Korea.

Venues

Group stage
All times are Korean Standard Time (KST)–UTC+9

Group A

 South Korea advanced to the final on drawing of lots.

Group B

Final

Awards

Winners

Individual awards

Scorers
3 goals
 Kate Gill

1 goal

 Collette McCallum
 Sally Shipard
 Jeon Ga-eul
 Kim Na-rae
 Maribel Domínguez
 Tania Paola Morales

External links
 2010 Peace Queen Cup 

2010
2010
Peace Queen Cup
2010 in women's association football
2010 in South Korean football
2010–11 in Australian women's soccer
2010–11 in Mexican football
2010 in Taiwanese football
2010–11 in English women's football
2010–11 in New Zealand association football